Karge may refer to:

 4822 Karge, an asteroid named after Orville B. Karge (1919–1990)
 Joseph Kargé (1823–1892), a military officer and educator
 Manfred Karge (born  1938), a German dramatist